The 2016 CS Finlandia Trophy was a senior international figure skating competition held in October 2016 in Espoo. It was part of the 2016–17 ISU Challenger Series. Medals were awarded in the disciplines of men's singles, ladies' singles, pair skating, and ice dancing.

Entries
The International Skating Union published the full preliminary list of entries on 12 September 2016.

Changes

Results

Men

Ladies

Pairs

Ice dancing

Synchronized skating

References

External links
 
 2016 CS Finlandia Trophy at the International Skating Union

CS Finlandia Trophy
2016 in Finnish sport